An agraffe is a part used principally on grand pianos. The agraffe is a guide at the tuning-pin end of the string, screwed into the plate, with holes through which the strings pass. It positions the strings vertically and laterally, determines the string's speaking length, and offers a clean termination from which the string can vibrate. Agraffes are used in the bass, tenor, and lower treble, but commonly give way to a capo d'astro bar in the upper treble.

Agraffes are usually made of solid brass, and come in 1, 2 or 3-string configurations. For American pianos they are available in two sizes (1/4" and 7/32" finely threaded studs). The string holes are typically countersunk to eliminate the likelihood of buzzing, even as the agraffes wear. They are installed with their width perpendicular to the strings.

Agraffe is also a term for the wire netting that surrounds the cork in a champagne bottle, enabling the cork to remain in place despite the high carbonic acid pressure in the bottle.

See also 
 Innovations in the piano

References 
 Good, Edwin. Giraffes, Black Dragons, and Other Pianos. Stanford, Calif.: Stanford University Press, 2001. 

Agraffe